The Nuovo Banco Ambrosiano was the bank replacing the Banco Ambrosiano after its collapse. In 1989 the bank merged with the Banca Cattolica del Veneto (Catholic Bank of Veneto) to form the Banco Ambrosiano Veneto. In 1998 the latter bank formed the Banca Intesa together with the Cassa di Risparmio delle Provincie Lombarde (Cariplo).

Sources

Banco Ambrosiano
Banco Ambrosiano
Re-established companies
Banks with year of establishment missing
Banks disestablished in 1989
1989 disestablishments in Italy